(TSC) is a TV station in Japan.

It is one of the TX Network (TXN) stations, broadcasting in Okayama Prefecture and Kagawa Prefecture, and it is the only TXN TV station in the Chugoku-Shikoku region.

Anime produced
TV Setouchi produced a few anime TV shows that aired nationwide on TXN:
Idol Densetsu Eriko (1989–90)
Idol Angel Yokoso Yoko (1990–91)
Getter Robo Go (1991–92)
Floral Magician Mary Bell (1992–93)
The Irresponsible Captain Tylor (1993)
Shima Shima Tora no Shimajirō (1993-2008)

Programming
TV Setouchi aired several independently produced anime TV shows which also aired on other networks like Tokyo MX.
Lime-iro Senkitan
Mamotte! Lollipop
Happiness!
Nanatsuiro Drops
Nichijou
Maken-ki!
Magical Girl Lyrical Nanoha Strikers
Galactic Armored Fleet Majestic Prince
Kantai Collection
Ai Tenchi Muyo!
Divine Gate
Luck & Logic
ACCA: 13-Territory Inspection Dept.
BanG Dream!

External links
The official website (Japanese)
 

Television stations in Japan
TX Network
Okayama Prefecture
Television channels and stations established in 1984
Mass media in Okayama